Gaurav Bajaj  is an Indian film actor. He was born on 6 April 1997. He has appeared in commercials and in movies such as Phir Kabhi, Dahek: A Restless Mind, Kirkit and Vroom.

Filmography

Television

References

Living people
1997 births
Indian male child actors
21st-century Indian male actors